Nageswara Rao or Nageshwara Rao is the name of:
 Akkineni Nageswara Rao (1923–2014), Telugu film actor and producer
 Edida Nageswara Rao (1934–2015), Telugu movie producer
 Karumuri Venkata Nageswara Rao (born 1964), Member of the Legislative Assembly of the Indian state of Andhra Pradesh
 Kasinathuni Nageswara Rao (1867–1938), journalist, nationalist and politician
 Lavu Nageswara Rao, Judge of the Supreme Court of India
 Mannem Nageswara Rao, Indian police officer, interim Director of Central Bureau of Investigation 2018
 Meduri Nageswara Rao (1910–1998), Member of Parliament
 Nama Nageswara Rao (born 1957), Indian politician
 Pendyala Nageswara Rao (1917–1984), dramatic actor, singer and music director
 Potla Nageswara Rao (born 1958), Member of Legislative Council (MLC) of Andhra Pradesh
 Rajanala Nageswara Rao (1928–1959), Telugu film actor
 Siva Nageswara Rao (born 1956), Telugu film director
 Thummala Nageswara Rao, member of the Telugu Desam Party